Squan Beach is the historic name of a barrier spit located on the Jersey Shore of the Atlantic Ocean in Ocean County, New Jersey, United States. Since the closing of Cranberry Inlet around 1812, it has been joined physically to Island Beach, and is a major component of the Barnegat Peninsula.

Geography
Squan Beach is a barrier peninsula that separates the Atlantic Ocean from Barnegat Bay. It abuts the mainland at the north end, and joins Island Beach to the south. Due to the former shifting of the Manasquan Inlet, which at times had been as far north as Stockton Lake, the portion of Manasquan in Monmouth County lying east of Watson's Creek may be considered a truncated portion of Squan Beach.

It was described in 1834 as,
 
An 1878 description of Squan Beach follows, viz,

Communities
Communities on the peninsula include Point Pleasant Beach, Bay Head, Mantoloking, Lavallette, Normandy Beach, and Ortley Beach. Brick Township Beaches I, II, and III, and the Toms River Township communities of Dover Beaches North (Ocean Beach and Chadwick Beach), and Dover Beaches South are also located on the peninsula.

References

Landforms of Ocean County, New Jersey
Barrier islands of New Jersey
Peninsulas of New Jersey
Spits of the United States
Beaches of Ocean County, New Jersey
Beaches of New Jersey